Kumta railway station is a station on Konkan Railway. It is at a distance of  down from origin. The preceding station on the line is Gokarna Road railway station and the next station is Honnavar railway station.

References 

Railway stations along Konkan Railway line
Railway stations in Uttara Kannada district
Karwar railway division